A navalised aircraft (or navalized aircraft) is an aircraft that has been specifically designed for naval use, in some cases as a variant of a land-based design. An aircraft based on an aircraft carrier is called carrier-based aircraft.

Characteristics

A navalised aircraft typically differs from its land-based equivalent by:

 The airframe, engine and avionics are marinised against salt water corrosion.
 It is designed to be used on a flight deck.  For a fixed wing aircraft this typically means catapult attachment points, a tailhook and strengthened undercarriage. Naval helicopters usually have wheels rather than skids and may have mechanisms to attach to the deck.
 It is designed to occupy minimum hangar space – for example the wings, tail-boom or rotors may fold.
 There is enhanced protection against water ingress (including that from hosing down with fresh water to get rid of salt water).
 Equipment such as sensors and weapons are optimised for naval roles.
 The avionics is compatible with the complex electronic equipment of a warship, and that there is no electromagnetic interference between the two.
 There is provision for ditching at sea.
 Helicopters may have provision for receiving fuel through the cabin while hovering adjacent to a ship.

For safety reasons, the aviation fuel provided by ships may be different (e.g. AVCAT) from that provided by airfields and tanker aircraft.

Examples

The T-45 Goshawk is a navalised version of the BAE Hawk jet trainer. Differences from the Hawk include changes to the undercarriage for aircraft carrier compatibility and a strengthened airframe. The engine design was also modified for the aircraft's role at sea. A proposed navalised version of the Alpha Jet would have had similar design modifications.

Other examples of navalised variants of land-based aircraft include:
 British Aerospace Sea Harrier
 Dassault Rafale M
 Hawker Sea Hurricane
 Mikoyan MiG-29K
 North American FJ-2 & FJ-3 Fury
 Supermarine Seafire
 Sikorsky SH-60 Seahawk

References

Naval aviation technology